Eva Lange  (15 June 1944 – 12 May 2017) was a Norwegian illustrator, printmaker and painter.

She was born in Arendal to Anna Theresie Larsen and Jean Emil Lange, and was married to painter and sculptor Victor Lind.

Lange was educated at the Norwegian National Academy of Craft and Art Industry in Oslo, and at the Norwegian National Academy of Fine Arts. She made her exhibition debut at Høstutstillingen in 1967. Her art works at the National Gallery of Norway include the naturalistic Frø from 1971 and the surrealistic drawing Demagog from 1977.

She was awarded the Prince Eugen Medal in 2001.

References

1944 births
2017 deaths
People from Arendal
Norwegian printmakers
20th-century Norwegian painters
21st-century Norwegian painters